The North American F-107 is North American Aviation's entry in a United States Air Force tactical fighter-bomber design competition of the 1950s. The F-107 was based on the F-100 Super Sabre, but included many innovations and radical design features, notably the over-fuselage air intakes. The competition was eventually won by the Republic F-105 Thunderchief, and two of the three  F-107 prototypes ended their lives as test aircraft. One is on display at the National Museum of the United States Air Force and a second at Pima Air and Space Museum.

Design and development
In June 1953, North American initiated an in-house study of advanced F-100 designs, leading to proposed interceptor (NAA 211: F-100BI denoting "interceptor") and fighter-bomber (NAA 212: F-100B) variants. Concentrating on the F-100B, the preliminary engineering and design work focused on a tactical fighter-bomber configuration, featuring a recessed weapons bay under the fuselage and provision for six hardpoints underneath the wings. Single-point refuelling capability was provided  while a retractable tailskid was installed. An all-moving vertical fin and an automated flight control system were incorporated which permitted the aircraft to roll at supersonic speeds using spoilers. The flight control system was upgraded by the addition of pitch and yaw dampers.

The aircraft's most distinguishing feature is its dorsal-mounted variable-area inlet duct (VAID). While the VAID was at the time a system unique to the F-107A, it is now considered to be an early form of variable geometry intake ramp which automatically controlled the amount of air fed to the jet engine. Although the preliminary design of the air intake was originally located in a chin position under the fuselage like the Vought F-8 Crusader, the air intake was eventually mounted in an unconventional position directly above and just behind the cockpit. The VAID system proved to be very efficient and NAA used the design concept on their A-5 Vigilante, XB-70 Valkyrie and XF-108 Rapier designs.

The air intake was in the unusual dorsal location as the Air Force had required the carriage of an underbelly semi-conformal nuclear weapon. The intake also severely limited rear visibility. Nonetheless this was not considered very important for a tactical fighter-bomber aircraft at that time, and furthermore it was assumed that air combat would be via guided missile exchanges outside visual range.

A two-seat version of the F-107 was proposed by North American, which seated both crewmembers under a single canopy in an extended forward fuselage, but none were built.

In August 1954, a contract was signed for three prototypes along with a pre-production order for six additional airframes.

Designation and names
Extensive design changes resulted in its redesignation from F-100B to F-107A before the first prototype flew. The F-107 was never given an official name, but was sometimes informally called the "Super Super Sabre" referring to North American's earlier fighter design, the F-100 Super Sabre. The flight crews referred to it as the "man eater", in reference to the position of the air intake directly above the cockpit. The aircraft is also sometimes informally called the "Ultra Sabre".

The designation "F-107A" was the only one assigned to the aircraft, though "YF-107A" is often used in publications.

Operational history

The first F-107A (serial number 55-5118) with North American's chief test pilot Bob Baker at the controls, made its initial flight on 10 September 1956, attaining Mach 1.03. Although successfully carrying out its flight, the brake chute did not deploy, which resulted in a "hot" landing with the nose gear strut breaking. The aircraft first achieved Mach 2 in tests on 3 November 1956.

It was joined by the second F-107A (55-5119), which made its first flight on 28 November 1956. It was used for weapons testing with both conventional and atomic bombs. The last prototype, (55-5120) had its maiden flight on 10 December 1956. At the conclusion of the F-107A's successful test program, the Tactical Air Command decided to hold a fly-off competition between the F-107A and the Republic F-105 which was designed to same mission requirements and used the same engine. Although the competition was close, the F-105 was selected as the new standard TAC tactical fighter. The three F-107A prototypes were relegated to test flying and the pre-production order was cancelled.

In late 1957, prototypes #1 (55-5118) and #3 (55-5120) were leased to the National Advisory Committee for Aeronautics (NACA) for high-speed flight research. Aircraft #1 is now in the collection of the Pima Air & Space Museum. In September 1959, with Scott Crossfield at the controls, aircraft #3 was damaged during an aborted takeoff. The aircraft was not repaired and, ultimately, used for fire fighting training and was destroyed in the early 1960s. (55-5120 was also noted to be stored in poor condition in the Tallmantz collection at Orange County Airport California in September 1970.)

Prototype #2 (55-5119) was not used by NACA and flown on 25 November 1957 to the National Museum of the United States Air Force at Wright-Patterson Air Force Base near Dayton, Ohio.

Variants
NA-212
North American design or charge number.
F-100B
Original military designation for the NA-212, not used
F-107A
Military designation for nine prototype NA-212s ordered, only three built.

Aircraft on display
55-5118 – Pima Air and Space Museum, adjacent to Davis-Monthan AFB in Tucson, Arizona.
55-5119 –On display in the new fourth aircraft hangar at the National Museum of the United States Air Force at Wright-Patterson AFB near Dayton, Ohio.

Specifications (F-107A)

See also

References

Citations

Bibliography

 Angelucci, Enzo and Peter Bowers. The American Fighter: the Definite Guide to American Fighter Aircraft from 1917 to the Present. New York: Orion Books, 1987. .
 Donald, David, ed. Century Jets. Norwalk, Connecticut, USA: AIRtime Publishing, 2003. .
 "F-107A: The Ultimate Sabre  DVD."  Georgetown, Texas: Flightline rocket.aero, 2005.
 Jenkins, Dennis R. and Tony R. Landis. Experimental & Prototype U.S. Air Force Jet Fighters. North Branch, Minnesota, USA: Specialty Press, 2008. .
 Jones, Lloyd S. U.S. Fighters: Army Air-Force 1925 to 1980s. Fallbrook, California: Aero Publishers, Inc., 1975. .
 Knaack, Marcelle Size. Encyclopedia of US Air Force Aircraft and Missile Systems: Volume 1 Post-World War II Fighters 1945–1973. Washington, DC: Office of Air Force History, 1978. .
 Pace, Steve. "Supersonic Cavaliers." Airpower, Volume 16, no. 6, November 1986.
 Simone, William J. North American F-107A. Simi Valley, California: Ginter Publishing, 2002. .
 United States Air Force Museum Guidebook. Wright-Patterson AFC, Ohio: Air Force Association, 1975 edition.

External links

 "North American F-100B/F-107."
 Boeing (North American history): YF-107A
 Arrival of first F-107A #118 (later NACA 207) to NASA FRC

F-107
1950s United States fighter aircraft
Single-engined jet aircraft
Cancelled military aircraft projects of the United States
Aircraft first flown in 1956